The Lansing Craft Center (LCC) was a specialized General Motors automobile assembly factory in Lansing Township, Michigan located at 2801 West Saginaw Street across from GM's Lansing Metal Center.

History 
The facility was originally built by GM as the "Oldsmobile Differential Plant and Foundry" in 1919. The foundry was repurposed as the "Reatta Craft Centre" in 1984 when GM chose it as the manufacturing site of the Buick Reatta, which began production in 1988 after a stamping plant, body shop, and assembly area were constructed.  After the end of production of the Reatta, the plant was renamed the "Lansing Craft Centre".  Over its existence, the Lansing Craft Center manufactured GM's low-volume vehicles including the EV1, Cadillac Eldorado, convertible Chevrolet Cavalier and Pontiac Sunfire and Chevrolet SSR.

Closure 
In November 2005, General Motors announced that it would close the Lansing Craft Center in mid-2006, and the final SSR, a unique black-on-silver model, was assembled on March 17, 2006. The plant was demolished from 2008 to 2009.

The facility was demolished in 2008 along with the Lansing Metal Center.

Vehicles produced
 1988–1991 Buick Reatta
 1995–2000 Chevrolet Cavalier convertible
 1995–2000 Pontiac Sunfire convertible
 1997–1999 General Motors EV1
 2000–2002 Cadillac Eldorado 
 2003–2006 Chevrolet SSR

Notes

References

General Motors factories
Former motor vehicle assembly plants
Economy of Lansing, Michigan
Motor vehicle assembly plants in Michigan
1987 establishments in Michigan
2006 disestablishments in Michigan